Emine Gümüş (born July 12, 1992) is a Turkish women's football forward, who plays in the Women's Super  League for Kdz. Ereğli Belediye Spor with jersey number 77. She is a member of the Turkey women's national team since 2014.

Club career 
Emine Gümüş obtained her license on 5 September 2006. She played for her hometown club Mersin Camspor in the Women's First and Second League. She transferred in the 2011–12 season to Adana İdmanyurduspor. After six seasons with Adana İdmanyurduspor, Gümüş moved to Kdz. Ereğlispor in the 2017-18 Turkish Women's First Football League. In October 2018, she transferred to the newly promoted First League club Hakkarigücü Spor. After appearing one season in the Women's Third League for Tavla Gençlikspor, she returned to the Women's First League with Fomget G.S.. The next season, she transferred to the newly founded club Çaykur Rizespor to play in the 2021-22 Super League. After one season, she signed with her former club Kdz. Ereğli Belediye Spor.

International career 
Gümüş was called up to the  Turkey women's national under-19 team for the friendly match against Russia on February 3, 2010. She capped twice for the women's junior team.

On May 7, 2014, she debuted at the 2015 FIFA Women's World Cup qualification – UEFA Group 6 match with the Turkey women's national team against Belarus.

Career statistics 
.

References

External links

Living people
1992 births
Sportspeople from Mersin
Turkish women's footballers
Women's association football forwards
Turkey women's international footballers
Adana İdmanyurduspor players
Karadeniz Ereğlispor players
Hakkarigücü Spor players
Fomget Gençlik ve Spor players
Çaykur Rizespor (women's football) players